Escape From The Shadows is the 1972 autobiography of Robin Maugham, later the 2nd Viscount Maugham.

The title refers to three huge shadows over Maugham’s life: his famous father, Frederick Herbert Maugham, his uncle, W. Somerset Maugham, and his homosexuality.

1972 non-fiction books
British autobiographies
Hodder & Stoughton books